Tidsskrift for Rettsvitenskap (English: "Journal of Jurisprudence") is a Norwegian law journal. It was established in 1888 by Francis Hagerup to "form a link between legal research in the Nordic countries" and is currently published by Universitetsforlaget. The journal is one of Scandinavia's preeminent academic journals in the field of law. It is ranked as a Level 2 journal, the highest level in the official Norwegian ranking (the Norwegian Scientific Index). Articles are published in the three Scandinavian languages: Danish, Norwegian, and Swedish.

The original spelling of the journal name was Tidsskrift for Retsvidenskab, which was changed to Tidsskrift for Rettsvidenskap in 1932 and to Tidsskrift for Rettsvitenskap in 1940, i.e. from a Danish spelling to a modern Norwegian spelling.

Editors-in-chief 
The following persons have been editors-in-chief of the journal, most of them worked at the Faculty of Law, University of Oslo:
 Francis Hagerup 1888–1921
 Fredrik Stang 1922–1936
 Erik Solem 1939–1949
 Carl Jacob Arnholm ?–1962
 Knut Selmer 1963–1964
 Carsten Smith 1963–1973
 Birger Stuevold Lassen 1974–1999
 Viggo Hagstrøm 1999–2013

References

External links  
 

Law journals
Publications established in 1888
1888 establishments in Norway
Multilingual journals
Norwegian-language journals
Universitetsforlaget academic journals
Swedish-language journals
Danish-language journals
5 times per year journals